Draeculacephala minerva (sometimes known as the grass sharpshooter or green sharpshooter), is a species in the family Cicadellidae.

References

Further reading

 

Articles created by Qbugbot
Insects described in 1927
Cicadellini